Ryan Christian Yarbrough (born December 31, 1991) is an American professional baseball pitcher for the Kansas City Royals of Major League Baseball (MLB). He has previously played in MLB for the Tampa Bay Rays. The Seattle Mariners selected Yarbrough in the fourth round of the 2014 MLB draft.

Amateur career
After graduating from All Saints' Academy in Winter Haven, Florida, Yarbrough played college baseball at Santa Fe College in 2011 before transferring to Old Dominion University. He pitched for the Old Dominion Monarchs in 2013 and 2014. He was drafted by the Milwaukee Brewers in the 20th round of the 2013 Major League Baseball Draft, but did not sign. In 2014, his senior season, he went 6–7 with a 4.50 ERA in 18 games (14 starts).

Professional career

Seattle Mariners
The Seattle Mariners selected Yarbrough in the fourth round of the 2014 Major League Baseball draft. Yarbrough made his professional debut with the Pulaski Mariners. After two games, he was promoted to the Everett AquaSox. Overall, he pitched in 14 games (10 starts) and had a 1.27 earned run average (ERA) with 58 strikeouts in  innings in 2014.

In 2015, he played for the AZL Mariners, Clinton LumberKings, and Bakersfield Blaze where he compiled a combined 4–8 record and 4.10 ERA in 22 starts. In 2016, he pitched for the Jackson Generals where he was 12–4 with a 2.95 ERA and 1.11 WHIP in 25 games started.

Tampa Bay Rays
On January 11, 2017, the Mariners traded Yarbrough, Mallex Smith, and Carlos Vargas to the Tampa Bay Rays for Drew Smyly. He spent the season with the Durham Bulls where he pitched to a 13–6 record and 3.43 ERA in 26 starts. The Rays added him to their 40-man roster after the season.

Yarbrough made the Rays' Opening Day roster in 2018. He made his debut against the Boston Red Sox, pitching four innings, allowing one run and recording three strikeouts. Yarbrough finished the season with 16 wins, the most for a rookie in franchise history, the most for a rookie in the 2018 season, and the second-most on the team. Yarbrough finished his rookie season posting an earned run average of 3.91 over  innings despite working predominantly out of the bullpen. Yarbrough was mainly utilized as the "bulk guy" behind the Rays' new opener strategy.

On April 24, 2019, he was optioned to AAA after registering an ERA of 8.10 in 5 appearances. Yarbrough eventually was called back up and won his 8th game and being added into the starting rotation, lowering his ERA to 3.93 by the end of July. On July 14, 2019 against the Baltimore Orioles, after Ryne Stanek opened with two perfect innings, Yarbrough then pitched six perfect innings of his own, losing the combined perfect game bid to a leadoff single in the ninth inning. His run of success continued in the season's second half, as he improved his ERA to 3.51 and his WHIP to 0.88 by September 10, which would have been second-best in MLB among starting pitchers if Yarbrough pitched enough innings to qualify. He struggled in his last few starts and finished the season 11–6 with a 4.13 ERA, 0.99 WHIP and 117 strikeouts over  innings.

Due to many injuries to their pitching staff to begin the 2020 season, Yarbrough was used exclusively in the rotation before suffering a groin injury and placed on the disabled list on August 29, 2020.

In 2020 he was 1-4 with a 3.56 ERA. He led the AL in hit batsmen, with seven.

On June 3, 2021, Yarbrough threw a complete game 9–2 victory against the New York Yankees at Yankee Stadium, which was the first Rays complete game since Matt Andriese threw one in May 2016. The five-year drought was the longest in the league. It was also Yarbrough's first win as a starter since he pitched into the ninth inning against the Mariners at Safeco Field in 2019, as well as his first career complete game.

On November 15, 2022, Yarbrough was designated for assignment. He was non-tendered and became a free agent on November 18.

Kansas City Royals
On December 13, 2022, Yarbrough signed a one-year contract with the Kansas City Royals.

Personal
Yarbrough and his wife, Nicole, married in 2019 and announced in 2021 they were expecting their first child.

Yarbrough grew up a Rays fan.

References

External links

Old Dominion Monarchs bio

1991 births
Living people
Sportspeople from Lakeland, Florida
Baseball players from Florida
Major League Baseball pitchers
Tampa Bay Rays players
Old Dominion Monarchs baseball players
Pulaski Mariners players
Everett AquaSox players
Arizona League Mariners players
Clinton LumberKings players
Bakersfield Blaze players
Jackson Generals (Southern League) players
Durham Bulls players